Ebenezer Dumont (November 23, 1814 – April 16, 1871) was a U.S. Representative from Indiana, serving two terms from 1863 to 1867. Prior to his service in  Congress, he was a general in the Union Army during the American Civil War.

Early life and career 
Born in Vevay, Indiana, his parents were John Dumont, who was a member of the Indiana Legislature in 1822–23, and was afterward a candidate for the office of Governor, against David Wallace, and Julia Louisa Dumont, educator and writer. 

Dumont pursued classical studies at Hanover College and studied law. He was admitted to the bar and commenced practice in Vevay. 

He served as member of the State house of representatives in 1838. He served as the treasurer of Vevay from 1839–1845. He then signed up for military service during the Mexican–American War, serving as a lieutenant colonel of the 4th Indiana Infantry Regiment.

Upon his return to the Hoosier State, Dumont resumed his law practice. He served as member of the State house of representatives in 1850 and 1853.

Civil War 
During the Civil War, Governor Oliver P. Morton appointed Dumont as colonel of the 7th Indiana Volunteer Infantry, which, after seeing initial action in western Virginia, primarily fought in the Western Theater. Dumont was promoted to brigadier general of volunteers on September 3, 1861, and served until February 28, 1863, when he resigned from the army to resume his political career.

Congress 
Dumont was elected as a Unionist to the Thirty-eighth Congress and was reelected as a Republican to the Thirty-ninth Congress (March 4, 1863 – March 3, 1867). He served as chairman of the Committee on District of Columbia (Thirty-eighth Congress) and the Committee on Expenditures in the Department of the Interior (Thirty-ninth Congress). He was not a candidate for renomination in 1866.

Later career and death 
He was appointed by President Ulysses S. Grant as the Governor of Idaho Territory, but died in Indianapolis, Indiana, on April 16, 1871, before taking the oath of office. He was interred in Crown Hill Cemetery.

See also

 List of American Civil War generals (Union)

References
 Retrieved on 2008-02-12

Union Army generals
People of Indiana in the American Civil War
American military personnel of the Mexican–American War
1814 births
1871 deaths
Burials at Crown Hill Cemetery
Speakers of the Indiana House of Representatives
Hanover College alumni
Indiana Unionists
Unionist Party members of the United States House of Representatives
People from Vevay, Indiana
19th-century American politicians
Republican Party members of the United States House of Representatives from Indiana